The 1931 National Derby took place during August with the final being held at Harold's Cross Stadium in Dublin on 21 August 1931. It was the fourth and last edition of the event before it took the mantle of the official Irish Greyhound Derby. The race at this stage was considered unofficial because it had not been ratified by the Irish Coursing Club.

The winner was Little Chummie, trained by Billy Quinn and owned and bred by Michael Grace from (Callan). The brindle dog born in June 1928 also won the National Cup at Shelbourne Park and the Lincoln Cup at Wembley.

Final result 
At Harolds Cross, 21 August (over 525 yards):

Distances 
3 (lengths)

See also
 1931 UK & Ireland Greyhound Racing Year

References

Greyhound Derby
Irish Greyhound Derby